OSD may refer to:

Science and medicine
 Ocean Science Discussions, the discussion and review section of the journal Ocean Science
 Optimal shape design, a part of the field of optimal control theory
 Oral sedation dentistry, the oral administration of sedatives to facilitate dental procedures
 Oral solid dose, a form of oral administration of medication
 Osgood–Schlatter disease, an inflammation of the growth plate at the tibial tuberosity which occurs mostly in teenage boys
 OSD , in the CCTV ( security camera) that is the "On-Screen Display".

Technology and computing
 Object storage device, computer data storage device that manages data as objects
 On-screen display, a feature of visual devices like VCRs and DVD players that displays program, position, and setting data on a connected TV or computer display
 Open Source Definition, criteria used by the Open Source Initiative to determine whether or not a software license can be considered open source
 OpenSearch Description document, an XML file format that identifies and describes a search engine
 Operating System Deployment, a component of Microsoft's System Center Configuration Manager product

Other uses
 Åre Östersund Airport, Sweden, IATA airport code
 Office of the Secretary of Defense, the principal staff of the United States Secretary of Defense
 Officer on Special Duty, a Bangladeshi, Indian, and Pakistani civil service officer
 Oklahoma School for the Deaf, a K-12 residential school for the deaf or hard-hearing students
 One Shot Deal, a live album by Frank Zappa posthumously released in 2008
 Oregon School for the Deaf
 Overseas Surveys Directorate, the United Kingdom's central survey and mapping organisation for British colonies and protectorates 1984–1991
 Oxnard Elementary School District, a school district in Oxnard, California